Bird food or bird seed is food (often varieties of seeds, nuts, and/or dried fruits) intended for consumption by wild and domestic birds. While most bird food is fed to commercial fowl (such as chicken or turkey), bird food is also used to feed pet birds or provide a feeding site for wild birds.

The various types of bird food reflect the species of bird that can be fed, whether they are carnivores, herbivores, insectivores, nectarivores, etc. Bird food can also differ by the feeding strategies employed by beaks in cracking the seed coat and obtaining the meat of the seed.

Black-oil sunflower seeds attract the widest variety of birds, and are commonly used in backyard bird feeders. However, other varieties of seed can help attract specific types of birds to gardens and backyards. In general, mixtures that contain red millet, oats, and other "fillers" are not attractive to most birds, and can lead to waste as the birds sort through the mix, as well as the potential for fungal and bacterial growth. 

While popular, bird feeders carry potential risks for the birds that feed there, such as disease, malnutrition, and predation by animals. Researchers recommend that bird feeders be disinfected every time they are refilled.

Types

Natural

Seed

Black sunflower seeds are often used in bird feeders, since they attract a wide variety of birds, have a high ratio of seed material to shell, and are high in fat content (which is nutritionally important for winter birds). Other common bird seeds include Niger, or thistle seed, a favorite of goldfinches and redpolls. Millet for sparrows and juncos as well as safflower for cardinals

Non-seed
Suet is often given to insect-eating birds like nuthatches and woodpeckers. Artificial nectar – essentially sugar water – attracts hummingbirds. However, this can lead to nutrient deficiencies and increased defecation for these birds. Bread and kitchen scraps are often fed to ducks and gulls, which is strongly discouraged as they can cause Angel wing disease. Chickens are commonly fed maize, wheat, barley, sorghum and milling by-products, in a mixture traditionally called chicken scratch. Pet parrots are fed fresh fruit, vegetables and nuts, in addition to seed.

These seeds and non-seed supplies are commonly obtained as by-products on farms, but can also be bought from independent retailers.

Commercial

Non Farm
Commercial bird food is widely available for feeding wild and domesticated birds, both seed combinations and pellets.

When feeding wild birds the Royal Society for the Protection of Birds (RSPB) suggests that it be done year-round, with different mixes of nutrients being offered each season. Selections should have additional fat content in the winter months, and additional proteins in the form of nuts, seeds, and dried worms in summer, when birds are changing their plumage and may be moulting.

Farm

Farmed birds that are fed with commercial bird food are typically given very specific, scientifically designed, pre-blended feed. Examples of commercial bird food for chickens include chick starter medicated crumbles, chick grower crumbles, egg layer mash, egg layer pellet, egg layer crumbles, egg producer pellet, and boilermaker med crumbles. Pellet crumbles are often prepared for tiny chicks. Mash is more finely ground.

See also

References

External links
Cornell Lab of Ornithology Food Preferences Chart
Gardening Australia - Fact Sheet: Bird-Attracting Plants

Poultry farming
Bird feeding
Pet foods